Abbas Qomi also known as Mohaddith Qomi was a Shia scholar, historian, and hadith narrator. He wrote books, including Mafatih al-Janan.

Biography 
Abbas Qomi was born in 1877 (1294 AH) in Qom, Iran. In 1904, according to a request from Abdul-Karim Ha'eri Yazdi, he returned to Qom and began teaching, writing, and preaching.

Qomi is a bestselling author in Iran.

Teachers 
Muhammad Kazim Khurasani, Sayyid Muhammad Kadhim Tabatabai, Sheikh Taqi Shirazi, and Mirza Husain Noori Tabarsi were his teachers at the Najaf seminary.

Books 
Qomi wrote 45 works, including:

Death 
Qomi died on 21 January 1941 at the age of 63 years. He was buried in the Imam Ali Shrine, Najaf near his teacher, Mohadis Noori.

See also 

 List of Maraji
 Ziyarat

References

Hadith scholars
Shia scholars of Islam
People from Qom
1877 births
Year of death unknown
1941 deaths